Radio Xpress FM 88.4 MHz is a licensed commercial radio station in the city of Nepalgunj in Nepal. Radio Xpress is the second commercial radio station in the region and the first ever music radio station in 
Nepal's Mid-Western and Far-Western regions.

It broadcasts over the air at 88.4 MHz and on the Internet through its website at http://www.radioxpressfm.com

Types of music played on RxFm 88.4 MHz
Pop
Classic rock
Modern rock
Rap/ Reggae/ Hip Hop/ Dance
Nepali pop, rock, modern, film soundtracks, folk, bhajans, classics
Hindi pop, film soundtracks, Ghazals, Bhajan
Hindi, Nepali, English Remixes

List Of Popular Programs
MOC RELOADED
MUSIC DOT COM
GOLI SISA KO
BOLLY BOUNCE
XPRESS UPDATE (News)
TIFFIN TIME
MORNING XPRESS
MOOD SWING
AALAP
ROBO ROCKS 
(SMS= SUNAU MERO SONG)
GET SET GO
TAKE ONE
TRING TRING
KOLLYWOOD XPRESS
FILMY COUNTDOWN
GRIHA BATIKA
SANIBAR RAMAILO SANIBAR
KIDS XPRESS
YO SAJH YO SUBASH
FRIDAY FIRE
BACK TO BACK
SOLO ARTIST
ONE MOVIE
 NAMASTE NPJ

Slogan
Your Music .. Your Station .

External links
 RXFM NEW ONLINE STREAMING SITE
 Official website for RXFM

Radio stations in Nepal